Narcis Iulian Bădic (born 15 July 1991) is a Romanian professional footballer who plays as a left back or a midfielder.

Club career

Bădic started his career with local team FC Politehnica Iași, and slowly made his way through the various youth teams, until the summer of 2010, when the club folded due to financial constraints.

Politehnica Iași

Later that summer, Bădic signed a contract with the successor of Poli, the newly founded Liga II club Politehnica Iași (2010). After two years in the Romanian second division, Bădic helped Politehnica to the 2011–12 Liga II title and subsequent promotion to Liga I. He made his first league debut on 29 April 2013, in a 1–2 defeat against FC Brașov.

After two dreadful seasons marred by various injuries, in which Bădic only managed a combined four league appearances, he finally made his first team comeback for the 2014–15 Liga I campaign.

For the 2017–18 season, manager Flavius Stoican moved Bădic from the midfield to the left back position. While playing in defence, he put in some of his best performances for Politehnica, helping them to a record sixth-place finish in the league. He was subsequently rewarded with a new two-year contract to keep him at the club until the summer of 2020.

Career statistics

Club

Honours

Politehnica Iași
Liga II: 2011–12, 2013–14

References

External links

1991 births
Living people
Sportspeople from Iași
Romanian footballers
Association football midfielders
Liga I players
Liga II players
FC Politehnica Iași (2010) players
Association football defenders